Joseph Anton Gall (1748–1807) was the bishop of Linz from 1788 to 1807.

He had been of great service to the Austrian school system as cathedral scholasticus and chief supervisor of the normal schools. He was an adherent of Josephinism, and permitted the chancellor of the chapter, George Rechberger, a layman and Josephinist, to exercise great influence over the ecclesiastical administration of his diocese.

Ecclesiastical conditions became more satisfactory during his episcopate, but much of the credit for this is due to Emperors Leopold II and Francis II who repealed many over-hasty reforms of Joseph II.

The general seminaries introduced in 1783 were set aside, and the training of the clergy was again made the care of the bishops. Bishop Gall, therefore, exerted himself for years to establish a theological institute for his diocese; it was opened in 1794.

Another permanent service of the bishop was the founding of a seminary for priests; for this he bought in 1804 a house out of his own means, and made the institution heir to all his property.

1748 births
1807 deaths
Bishops of Linz
People from Weil der Stadt